Siddharta is a five-piece Slovenian alternative rock band formed in 1995. They are named after the 1922 novel by the German writer Hermann Hesse, Siddhartha.

History 
Siddharta was formed in 1995 when four friends – Tomi Meglič (vocals, guitar), Primož Benko (guitar, back vocals), Primož Majerič (bass) and Boštjan Meglič (drums) – got together and named themselves after a well-known Hermann Hesse novel because they liked the sound of it.

Their earliest work was first performed in front of an audience on 17 March 1995. The band had 40 visitors packed in their rehearsal place at Šentvid High School in Ljubljana, but at this first show the raw energy characteristic for Siddharta's live performances in the years to come could already be felt. Soon they started developing their own sound, enriched with a saxophone. Cene Resnik joined the band, who at that point mostly played club gigs and at the end of 1996 they played their 14 demo tapes in a famous club in Ljubljana, K4.

In 1997 Siddharta – alongside a lineup of other promising young bands – took part in the Tivolski Pomp project, which resulted in a compilation for which Siddharta contributed their song Lunanai and made their first TV performance in the Pomp show on national TV.

Nord (2001): Second album
After their headline performance at Slovenia's biggest rock festival, the Rock Otočec festival Siddharta retreated from public life and locked themselves up in the studio.
Six months of Siddharta silence later their second album Nord broke out in May 2001. An English version was also recorded. Peter Penko (Laibach, Silence, Coptic Rain) and Žarko Pak (Big Foot Mama, Radyoyo) worked as producers; many guests were invited to work with the band for Nord: Tomaž Humar, Anita Kay, Boštjan Gombač, Bojan Cvetrežnik, Robert Rebolj and others. For the recording of the Nord album Siddharta invited the bass player Jani Hace, who later joined the band as a full member.

Siddharta's third video, the video for B Mashina was recorded, which launched the band to the stars; the video remained on the charts for over ten weeks. 
 
The sales of Nord broke all known records of that time as over 7,000 copies were sold in less than two months after release. In Slovenia, the only band to top that was U2. Nord has been sold in 30,000 copies.

Tour, lineup changes, remix album
Siddharta won another Zlati petelin award in 2001, the Music Group of the Year award.

In the spring of 2001 the band set out on an all-Slovenian stage expedition, playing nearly 80 live performances, selling out even the largest sports halls. In September 2001 their fourth video was recorded, Samo Edini, both in Slovenian and in English just as B Mashina was. After the launch of the video the Nord sales rose 80 per cent.

In November 2001 Siddharta filled the Kodeljevo sports hall in Ljubljana, making it their largest sold-out concert to date.

In February 2002 Primož Majerič decided to leave the band. Siddharta and Primož, who had been less intensively present in the band for personal reasons ever since the release of the second album, Nord, parted in a friendly spirit. Formally, Siddharta continued their work without a bass player. In March 2003 Jani Hace became a full member of the band.

In spring 2002 preparations for a remix album began. Many recognized Slovenian artists and DJ's were invited to work on it, such as Laibach, DJ Umek, DJ Kanzyani, Jamirko, McBrane and others. The remix album Silikon Delta was released in June 2002. Along with the album release, the Under Venus video – an animation video created by Testtube Productions – was launched. It won the never-before-awarded Viktor award for Best Video.

Siddharta won the Viktor 2001 award for Best Performer of the year and Studio City's Bumerang award for Best Band of 2002.

The band wrapped up the Nord tour with a significant performance in Cankar Hall, supported by the RTV Slovenia Symphony Orchestra on 16 June 2002. The concert was aired live on national Radio Val 202 and the video recording shown on national television.

In the end of October Siddharta recorded a commercial for Slovene mobile provider Mobitel, which was aired on MTV Europe. For the commercial Siddharta's remake of Vlado Kreslin's song Od Višine Se Zvrti was used.

Rh- (2003): Third album
The band wrapped themselves in silence once again and started their studio work in December 2002. In July 2003 Siddharta and Multimedia Records, the company they had worked with for four years of their successful musical journey and had released all their previous discography projects: their debut album Id, the single Lunanai, their second album Nord and the remix album Silikon Delta, agreed to discontinue their cooperation. The band thanked Multimedia Records for the support received on their way and proceeded to work with KifKif Records, announcing the release of the new album.

The studio work lasted many months, during which they had worked with Peter Penko, Dali Strniša, Rok Golob and Žare Pak. On 13 August 2003 the result was released with KifKif Records: Siddharta's third studio album Rh-.The release of the album Rh- had been foretold by the single Rave. Directed by Petar Pašić, the video for Rave was recorded in Belgrade. The video was a huge success on national charts and was played on MTV within the World Chart Express. An English version of the album was recorded and released on Slovenian market as a special limited-edition album on 1 September 2003. The album was released in unique bloodbag-resembling packages and in music stores placed on transfusion hangers. The special-edition album was released in 1,500 copies, which were sold out in a matter of days.

Rh- tour
A month after the release of their third studio album Rh-, Siddharta opened the Rh- tour with a concert on Ljubljana's central football stadium, a concert which astounded all who were there and those who were not. On 13 September Siddharta, accompanied by the RTV Slovenia Symphony Orchestra and 60 dancers, played before a crowd of over 30,000 people and a few thousand who could not get in as the concert had been sold out way in advance. It was an event never yet seen in Slovenia and it received incredible media coverage.

The preparations for the project had begun many months beforehand, from careful stage-planning to the choreography and music arrangements for the orchestra. Siddharta chose to work with those who had proven to be the men for the job. The choreography was entrusted to Miha Krušič (choreography for the Go Easy video) and the music arrangements to Milko Lazar and Slavko Avsenik Jr (the arrangements for the 2002 Križanke concert).
What sprouted was a sight for sore eyes: three stages, breathtaking choreographies and costumes, eye-watering orchestrations, Siddharta at their best, and a blanket of over 60,000 hands.

The stadium concert was the beginning of an amazing tour. Playing two to three times a week, the Rh- tour visited all parts of the country, took a detour to Austria for a day, and ended just after Christmas in a sold-out concert just like all were. The stadium concert was aired on both national radio and television in prime time during the New Year holidays. It received massive response from the media and was labeled event of the year 2003 numerous times.

MTV and other awards
In February 2004 MTV Europe chose to use Siddharta's My Dice for the new music chart show The Rock Chart jingle. Siddharta gladly accepted the offer.

In March 2004 the special-edition Rh- packaging and its designer Sašo Dornik won yet another designer award: the Grand award of the 13th Slovene Advertising Festival (SOF) in the category of miscellaneous means of advertising.

The end of March was marked by the Viktor awards. Siddharta won two: the fan-voted Popularity Viktor and the Viktor presented by the panel of expert judges – the Viktor award for Special Achievements, a public recognition of the stadium concert success. Siddharta took the opportunity to thank all who helped them bring their idea to life.

The bloodbag, the special-edition Rh- packaging, had a new – third in a row – success at an international festival of creative communication called Magdalena. In the category of Other means of communication the international jury presented the bloodbag creator Sašo Dornik with first prize, the Golden Bra award.

In June 2004 Menart Records presented to their bands achievements and popularity awards. Siddharta won the highest possible recognition of sales in Slovenia named a Diamond record. Siddharta expressed their deep gratitude to their devoted fans for all the support they had received from them.

Siddharta's special-edition CD bloodbag package has been entered to the Cresta (the world's most prestigious designer and advertising awards program) short-list of finalists.

After its world premiere on Monday 13 September 2004 Siddharta's latest video 'My Dice' was aired exclusively on MTV Europe for a week, also marked by being MTV's Artist of the Week. Since 20 September it has also been aired on other important music TV stations and the 'My Dice' single on radio stations across Europe.

Siddharta's fan base grew by the day. With the wish to act upon the requests of their most devoted fans for live performances of some older Siddharta songs and to quench their own thirst for live performances before domestic audience, Siddharta decided to go on a mini tour across Slovenia in the end of 2004 to do just that. It was Siddharta's way of bidding their farewells before retreating to focus on promotion abroad.

MTV EMA
Spring 2005 brought the release of the international Rh- and new public recognitions. Siddharta was voted another Band-of-the-Year Viktor award by their domestic audience and received perhaps the greatest recognition for their accomplishments so far with the nomination for MTV's Europe Music Award (EMA). From the EMA awards show in Lisbon Siddharta returned with an EMA of their own: the Best Adriatic Act EMA 2005.

Rh- (English, 2005)
The English version of Rh-, which had already been released as the bloodbag limited edition in 2003, was remade and re-released internationally in spring 2005. The lyrics had been altered and a vocal coach hired to bring out the best Siddharta had to offer the world public.

The album was released in Germany, Austria, Switzerland, Poland, Croatia and Slovenia in two different versions: the regular English edition and the special edition with a bonus DVD. The DVD included Siddharta's videos Rave, Insane and the amazing My Dice, the making-of documentaries, live videos recorded in the big stadium concert, band photos and an exclusive interview, in which the band presented their own view of their music of the past, present and future, the music scene in the band's home country, Slovenia, their music influences, their devoted fan base, their past albums and plans for the future. They took some time to reflect on their creative process and the way they felt it would change for the next album. They described it as going back to their roots.

Both covers were designed by the many times awarded Sašo Dornik and his Ventilator team. For the special edition, they decided to use a slightly different concept than the one that was used for the regular edition. It was a special edition and as such it was given a new, special cover.

The reviews of the album came from all around the world and were without exception good.

In the summer 2005 the band went on their first abroad tour, a club tour across Germany. The band's fan base grew by the show and their satisfaction peaked in performing before a clubful of German fans in Berlin.

The band never forgot about their Slovene fans and decided to perform at the big national music festivals such as Rock Otočec and Piše se leto 2005. We could say they were going back in time to remember and honour their first performances there or on the other hand merely feeding their domestic fans exactly what they needed: a new dose of the pure Siddharta live energy. The fans had earned it – the fan votes won Siddharta the fourth popularity Viktor.

It was in 2005 that Siddharta performed for the first time before the international audience at the Exit festival in Novi Sad, Serbia.

The success of 2005 was wrapped up in November as Siddharta received their first international recognition for their work: in Lisbon, Portugal they were awarded their first MTV European Music Award (EMA) for Best Act. For the first time in their career they shared the stage with the big names of world music industry.

Greetings from the Lisbon stage were in a way a farewell. In end-2005 the band isolated themselves to work on the materials for the new album.

Petrolea (2006): Fourth album
Almost three years after the release of their last studio album, Siddharta returned with Petrolea, an album much different in sound and arrangement from its symphony-based predecessor. One could say that in a way this album was Siddharta's return "to the garage" and thus came close to the band's original sound. This, however, does not mean that the production was any less glamorous. On the contrary, a selection of domestic and foreign studios, combined with the experienced ear of Žare Pak and the musical perfectionism of the band members offered Slovenia an album marked by many a critic as album of the year 2006.

Having kept their fans waiting that long for a new album, Siddharta rewarded them with a free cultural event – an opening concert at the Ljubljana Castle. It was at the same time the first rock concert ever to have taken place in the castle courtyard, the event thus placing a new milestone on the band's path of achievements.

Autumn 2006 was spent on the road as Siddharta played 22 indoor concerts and a tour-closing concert in Ljubljana's Prešeren Square just before New Year. The latter was filmed by the national TV in order to air it a few days afterwards. Young promising Slovene bands opened for Siddharta throughout the tour. They were given the opportunity for a big-stage experience, which would definitely pay off later.

The Slovene and international audience did not neglect to see Siddharta's qualities and so the band was again nominated for the MTV EMA and it received the Viktor award for Artist of the year. It was at the very Viktor awards show that Siddharta and Dan D premiered in performing their concocted number Male roke / Voda. The hit swarmed radio waves immediately and remained on top of music charts most of 2007.

The spring 2007 leg was spent in concerts again, clubbing. Over 30 shows, among these one for Slovenes living in Italy and one for those in Vienna – these brought back to life Siddharta's nearly forgotten feelings of performing in a club. Rejuvenated and very much in tune they played most Slovenian summer festivals.

Male Roke (EP, 2007)
Siddharta's cooperation with Dan D was marked by the release of the Male Roke EP, which included the above-mentioned duet, the original title song and four live numbers. Just like the Petrolea cover design, the Male Roke cover design is again a work by Sašo Dornik and his Ventilator creative group.

Izštekani (live – unplugged, 2007)
Eight years after their first performance in the well-acclaimed radio show Izštekani (Unplugged), hosted by Jure Longyka on national radio, Siddharta were invited to perform live for a second time. The acoustic versions of selected numbers from all four albums were later released as a CD + bonus DVD. The CD contains the performed songs only and the DVD features the whole show recorded live on camera.

Maraton (live, 2007)
Four years had passed since the breathtaking Stadium concert and Siddharta were ready for a new venture. They placed it in Ljubljana's Hala Tivoli, packed with fans eagerly awaiting a new blow by Siddharta – and the show had been sold out within a couple of weeks. The Marathon was another "first-ever" in Siddharta's long history of achievements. The band – with a little help of their music friends – performed their whole set-list from day one, a total of 56 songs, and was on stage for full 5 hours plus. Siddharta's first bass player Primož Majerič, Big Foot Mama's singer Grega Skočir, rapper Nikolovski, legend of Slovenian rock music Vlado Kreslin and string quartet Godalika joined them on stage.

The concert was released in December as a collection of four CDs with a bonus DVD, which featured a documentary on the happening in- and outside the hall, both before and during the Marathon concert. The documentary was shot and cut by Dafne Jemeršič.

Saga (2009): Fifth album
Spring of 2008. Doing the undoable, Siddharta released a video of an inexistent song, Autumn Sun. The song had been only known and available as its own remix from the 2002 Silikon Delta album of remixes but was given its own form with this video.

Just as autumn's sun placed them in the marathonic spotlight, spring brought a wind of change for Siddharta. It was both the band and their supporting machinery that were struck with changes. Cene R., after over ten years as a member of Siddharta, decided to give it a go as a solo artist and the band in full friendly support accepted his decision. Another decision was made – Siddharta rounded up their cooperation with their yearlong manager Iztok Kurnik and entrusted this challenge to Veto Group.

With a new wind beneath their wings and the incredible eagerness of the new team, the band, now a group of 5 and without the sax, was armed and ready for their upcoming ventures.

On 19 December 2008 they released an EP entitled Vojna idej (lit. War of Ideas, English title Battle of Bombay).

Ross Robinson has produced the new album.

The new album named Saga was released on 21 November 2009 with a promotional concert in Kino Šiška.

Track list of Saga:

1. Narava
2. Angel Diabolo
3. Alarm
4. Nevarno Mesto
5. Napalm 3
6. Baroko
7. Stampedo
8. Od Mraka Do Zore
9. Vojna Idej
10. Madam
11. Tom Waits For Me

Members

Current members
 Tomi Meglič – Guitar, vocals
 Primož Benko – Guitar
 Jani Hace – Bass
 Tomaž O. Rous – keyboards, Programming
 Boštjan Meglič – drums, percussion

Former members
 Primož Majerič – Bass
 Cene Resnik – Saxophone, EWI, keyboards

Discography 

Studio albums in bold.

Awards

2000
 Bumerang award – Breakthrough
 Zlati petelin award – Best new Act
 Zlati petelin award – Best rock album
 Zlati petelin award – Best album

2001
 Zlati petelin award – Best group

2002
 Viktor award – Artist of the year
 Bumerang award – Group of the year

2003
 Viktor award – Video of the year
 Golden drum award – Rh- limited edition packaging design

2004
 Viktor award – Artist of the year
 Viktor award – Special achievements
MTV's Artist of the Week

2005
 Viktor award – Artist of the year
 MTV European Music Award – Best Adriatic Act
 Diamond record for the Rh- record

2006
 Viktor award – Best Music Act

2007
 Viktor award for Artist of the year 2006
 Gold record for the Petrolea album
 Platinum record for the Petrolea album

2008
 Nomination for the Viktor award in the category of Artist of the year 2007

References

External links 

 Official site
 S.A.M.O. – Official forums
 Official Myspace
 Official Youtube
 Official Deezer

Slovenian rock music groups
Musical groups established in 1995
Slovenian hard rock musical groups
Musical groups from Ljubljana
MTV Europe Music Award winners